is the second live album by Japanese singer Misia. It compiles live material, spread out over two discs, collected from the Hoshizora Live concert series, recorded from its first installment in 2001 to the most recent in 2015, in commemoration of the series' 15th anniversary. The double album was released on March 9, 2016, through Ariola Japan.

Background and release
The album consists of twenty-four of the best takes selected from Misia's Hoshizora Live concert series, which spans fifteen years and eight tours. The compilation includes live recordings, some previously released and others not, of "Tsutsumikomu Yō ni...", "Hi no Ataru Basho", "Believe", "Aitakute Ima", "Shiawase o Forever", and from her latest studio album "Shiroi Kisetsu", "Nagareboshi", and "Anata ni Smile :)", among others.

The album was released in standard edition and limited edition, the latter being packaged in digipak format and featuring different cover art. The artwork for the album's standard and limited editions, which depicts a cluster of rabbits looking up to the moon, a nod to the moon rabbit folklore that inspired the most recent Hoshizora no Live tour subtitle, was designed by Paris-based Japanese designer Shinsuke Kawahara.

Commercial performance
Misia Hoshizora no Live Song Book: History of Hoshizora Live entered the daily Oricon Albums Chart at number 7, where it also peaked. The album debuted at number 10 on the weekly Oricon Albums Chart, selling 5,000 copies. It also debuted on the Billboard Japan Hot Albums chart, at number 24, and on the Top Albums Sales chart, at number 11. Misia Hoshizora no Live Song Book: History of Hoshizora Live charted for four consecutive weeks on the Oricon Albums Chart, selling a reported total of 7,000 copies during its run.

Track listing

Charts

Sales

References

External links
 

2016 live albums
2016 compilation albums
Misia albums
Ariola Japan albums
Japanese-language live albums